Aich may refer to:

Aich, Styria, a municipality in Styria, Austria 
Aich (surname), a Bengali Hindu surname 
Aich (river), a river in Baden-Württemberg, Germany 
Aich's Alloy, a type of brass
Gut Aich Priory, a Benedictine monastery in St. Gilgen in Austria
Animesh Aich, Bangladeshi film maker, actor, director and writer
Jewel Aich, Bangladeshi magician and bansuri player
Manohar Aich (1912–2016), Indian bodybuilder
Prodosh Aich (born 1933), retired Bengali-Indian professor, author of several books 

AICH may refer to:
 AICH, Advanced Intelligent Corruption Handling, a corruption handling method used in eMule
 American Indian Community House

See also
Eich (disambiguation)